IEEE International Frequency Control Symposium (IFCS) started in 1947 and its name has changed over the years. It is one of the conferences sponsored by the IEEE Ultrasonics, Ferroelectrics, and Frequency Control Society (UFFC-S). IEEE IFCS has been an annual conference since its start in 1947.

The Frequency Control Standing Committee of the IEEE UFFC-S is responsible for the organization of IEEE IFCS.

References

External links 
https://ieee-uffc.org/frequency-control/ — More details and some history (including historical data and a list of all the conferences) of IFCS can be found here. 

IEEE conferences